The Peruvian short-tailed opossum (Monodelphis peruviana) is a species of marsupial in the family Didelphidae.It is found in Bolivia and Peru.

Classification 

This species was initially described as Peramys peruvianus by Wilfred H. Osgood in 1913. It was later placed in the genus Monodelphis and was included under the species M. adusta (sepia short-tailed opossum) by Cabrera (1958). S. Solari (2004), while comparing and revising diagnoses of specimens of the species M. adusta with Monodelphis ronaldi sp. nov., found that Monodelphis adusta peruvianus was differentiable from M. adusta; having a shorter head-body length but longer dorsal hair than M. adusta.

References

Opossums
Marsupials of South America
Taxa named by Wilfred Hudson Osgood